Dapunia Union is a union parishad in Mymensingh Sadar Upazila of Mymensingh District, in Mymensingh Division, Bangladesh. It has an area of 7268 acres.

Demographics 
As of the 2001 census, the union had a population of 41,690.

References

Unions of Mymensingh Sadar Upazila
Populated places in Mymensingh District